"Talk if Yuh Talking" was Anderson's first official single from Cherine Anderson'sThe Introduction-Dubstyle EP. It was first released to Jamaican radio in early 2009 and saw some success in the early months.  The song was selected as ROOTS FM's "What's the Verdict" winner by inner-city listeners who connected with its lyrical content and groove.  The video made its way onto  RE TV MVP video top 10 charts and  CVM TV Hit List.   On the European side, 'Talk if Yuh Talking" charted  at #8 on New Style radio in London. This song peaked at #2 on the Jamaican Music Countdown charts where it was a mainstay for 22 weeks in the Top 20.

2009 singles
2009 songs